Pedro Alcántara Quijano Montero (1878–1953) was a Colombian artist, engraver, author and set designer. Born in Bogota, he studied at Escuela de Bellas Artes under Recio among others. Later, he taught at his alma mater for more than 30 years. He was also a set designer for the Teatro Colón de Bogotá, and taught several generations of Colombian artists. He wrote several works: Ricaurte en San Mateo, Niño con Casco, La misa de los conquistadores, La Pola conducida al cadalso and Reyerta del 20 de julio, among others. He died in Bogota in 1953.

References

Colombian artists